Perú.21 is a Peruvian newspaper based in Lima.

Background
In 2002, Perú.21 was founded by the economist Augusto Álvarez Rodrich, and it has quickly become one of the leading newspapers of Peru, known for its provocative caricatures and cartoon publications.

Controversy

In 2012, the official website of Perú.21 was briefly blocked by the Government of Peru after it had published an article criticizing the government's budget management.

A few months later, a former journalist who had earlier worked for Perú.21 was arrested and imprisoned for hacking into the email accounts of government officials.

See also
 List of newspapers in Peru
 Media of Peru

External links 
 Official website of Perú.21

References

Newspapers published in Peru
Spanish-language newspapers
Publications established in 2002
Mass media in Lima
2002 establishments in Peru